The Swan 57 was designed by Olin Stephens and built by Nautor's Swan and first launched in 1977. 49 boats were built during a production run that started in 1977 and ended in 1984. The Swan 57 was one of the last boats designed for Nautor of Finland by Sparkman & Stephens. The boat was offered in both sloop and ketch configurations and later a centerboard option was added.

References

External links
 Nautor Swan
 

Sailing yachts
Keelboats
1970s sailboat type designs
Sailboat types built by Nautor Swan
Sailboat type designs by Olin Stephens
Sailboat type designs by Sparkman and Stephens